Mina Tolu is a Maltese politician, activist who champions LGBTQIA causes and is a green activist who has campaigned to raise awareness of transgender rights and gender equality in Europe.  They ran for the 2019 European Parliament election in Malta.

Early life 
Tolu and their twin sibling, Ludo Tolu, were born on 31 August 1991. Together, they founded the Maltese Student Organisation, We Are, in 2010. Tolu's father, Giancarlo Tolu, is a Maltese sportsman who broke a Guinness World Record in bowling in 2004 and represented Malta at the European Senior Bowling Championships and the Senior World Cup.

Tolu graduated with a Bachelor of Communications (Hons) from the University of Malta in 2014. Their dissertation project consisted of the creation of a comic meant to reach out to the LGBT Young Adult (YA) audience. The comic was aimed at the Maltese audience, where literature of this type is limited.

Activism and career

LGBTQI activism 
Tolu began advocating for LGBTQIA rights in 2010, starting with the foundation of We Are (LGBTQIA youth & student organization) at the University of Malta.

From 2014 to 2015, Tolu was a board member and Co-Chair of IGLYO - the International LGBTQIA Youth and Student Organization (2014 - 2015). They were IGLYO's candidate for the Council of Europe Advisory Council of Youth (CCJ) during 2016 and 2017. They were elected to the Advisory Council of Youth where they worked on portfolios of mental health, counter-narratives and 'no hate speech'. In 2015, Tolu joined the staff team of TGEU - Transgender Europe as Communications Officer. 
In 2016, Tolu represented Malta at One Young World Summit in Ottawa, Canada. They delivered a speech on trans rights and was a member on a panel about gender equality. Tolu spoke about challenging gender stereotypes, gender-neutral pronouns and stressed the need for gender equality to include transgender and gender-non-conforming people. During their speech on trans rights and violence against trans people at the One Young World Summit, Tolu spoke about TGEU's Trans Murder Monitoring project and called on the One Young World community fighting similar forms of discrimination, violence and hatred towards diversity to unite together and bring change in all these communities.

In 2018, Mina Tolu joined the Women Deliver Young Leaders program, which is a global advocacy program that develops youth activists to work for gender equality and women's rights. They returned to local activism in Malta by joining the Pride Week events in the run-up to Malta Pride 2018. In August 2018, Tolu joined the Human Rights Conference at Euro Pride held in Stockholm.

Environmental activism 
In 2015, Tolu coordinated the national referendum campaign SHOut - Spring Hunting Out (No campaign) for the Maltese environmental NGO BirdLife Malta that aimed to abolish spring bird hunting in Malta. The result of the vote was a slim victory for the Yes Campaign of 2,220 votes.

Recognition 
Mina Tolu was nominated and won the student award at the first LGBTQIA Community Awards in Malta, 2014. Their twin, Ludo Tolu, won the same award. In the same year, they were awarded Kokka Attiva by the University Student Council (KSU) for their work as a student at the University of Malta and was nominated for a JCI Malta young leader award.

Personal life 
Tolu is non-binary.

References 

1991 births
Living people
Maltese LGBT people
Transgender rights activists
Transgender non-binary people
Maltese LGBT rights activists
University of Malta alumni
Non-binary activists
Non-binary politicians